Toys for Tots is a program run by the United States Marine Corps Reserve which distributes toys to children whose parents cannot afford to buy them gifts for Christmas. It was founded in 1947 by reservist Major Bill Hendricks.

The Marine Toys for Tots Foundation, a 501(c)(3) not-for-profit public charity located in Triangle, Virginia, funds, raise funds for, and supports the program.

History
Toys for Tots began as a Los Angeles charitable effort in 1947. Major Bill Hendricks, USMCR, was inspired by his wife Diane when she tried to donate a homemade Raggedy Ann doll to a needy child but could not find any organization to do so. At her suggestion, he gathered a group of local Marine reservists, including Lieutenant Colonel John Hampton, who coordinated and collected some 5,000 toys for local children that year from collection bins placed outside Warner Bros. movie theaters. Jon B. Riffel also helped found the organization. Their efforts were successful. In 1948, a feasibility report for the Marines using it as a national public relations and recruitment tool was written by Maj. Donald G Clarke USMCR. Toys For Tots was launched as a national campaign. Hendricks used his position as director of Public Relations for Warner Brothers Studio to enlist celebrity support, as well as have Walt Disney and his animators design the red toy train logo. A theme song for the program was written in 1956 by Sammy Fain and Paul Francis Webster, and would be recorded by Nat King Cole, Jo Stafford, Peggy Lee, among others.

Until 1979, Marine reservists (frequently in their dress blue uniforms) and volunteers would collect and refurbish used toys. In 1980, only new toys were accepted, as reservists were no longer able to dedicate drill hours to refurbishing toys, as well as legal concerns, to prevent the accidental giving of recalled items, and the mixed message of giving hand-me-downs as a message of hope.

In 1991, the Secretary of Defense authorized the creation and affiliation with the nonprofit charity foundation. In 1995, the Secretary of Defense approved Toys for Tots as an official mission of the Marine Corps Reserve.

Noting in 1996 that many communities did not have a Marine reservist presence, the commander of the Marine Forces Reserve authorized Marine Corps League detachments and other local organizations to fill the gaps in toy collection and distribution.

In 2009, the program received support from First Lady Michelle Obama, who placed the first collection box at the White House. In December 2011, she took part in a Toys for Tots activity at Joint Base Anacostia-Bolling.

, the Toys for Tots Program and Foundation have collected and distributed more than 512 million toys.

The program draws interest from multiple celebrities who appreciate the youth aspect of the charity. In 2022, the Backstreet Boys were inspired by young band First Day of School (band) who had raised money for the charity through busking, and donated a portion of $25,000 to the charity in their name.

As of today, the charity has expanded year-round efforts that extend support to underprivileged children across the Nation outside of Christmastime. They have a Literacy Program dedicated towards providing age-appropriate books to children in low-income neighborhoods to break the cycle of poverty. 

Toys for Tots also has a Native American Program that donates toys and books to children on participating remote Reservations in collaborative support with the Office of the Vice President of the Navajo Nation's Navajo Literacy Program.

Mission
The mission of the program is "to collect new unwrapped toys and distribute those toys to less fortunate children at Christmas."

The stated goal is to "deliver, through a new toy at Christmas, a message of hope to less fortunate youngsters that will assist them in becoming responsible, productive, and patriotic citizens." 

However, since the initial conception of their mission statement, Toys for Tots has expanded their efforts year-round to promote literacy amongst underprivileged children with their Literacy Program, and they now provide toys and books to Native American children through their Native American program.

Notable achievements 
 2003 Outstanding Nonprofit Organization of the Year (DMA NPF)
 Reader's Digest Best Children's Charity of 2003
 One of the top 10 charities of 2003 on the Forbes "Gold Star" list
Charity Navigator four star ratings in both 2005 and 2006

References

External links

Marine Toys for Tots Foundation
Marine Toys for Tots: Toy Donation Locations

Charities based in Virginia
Christmas in the United States
Organizations associated with the United States Marine Corps
United States Marine Corps Reserve
1947 establishments in California
Songs with music by Sammy Fain
Songs with lyrics by Paul Francis Webster